A Pseudocolumn is a "column" that yields a value when selected, but which is not an actual column of the table.  An example is RowID or SysDate.  It is often used in combination with the DUAL table.

References

Databases